Olean is an unincorporated community in Brown Township, Ripley County, in the U.S. state of Indiana.

History
Olean was laid out in 1858. The community was named after Olean, New York. A post office was established at Olean in 1844, and remained in operation until it was discontinued in 1905.

St. Paul Lutheran Church in Olean was recognized by the Indiana Senate in 2007 on its 150th anniversary.

Geography

References

Unincorporated communities in Ripley County, Indiana
Unincorporated communities in Indiana